Ballyfermot College of Further Education (BCFE) is an educational institution in Ballyfermot, Dublin, Ireland, a college of further and higher education.

Management   
Ballyfermot College of Further Education is managed by the City of Dublin Educational and Training Board (CDETB) with a local Board of Management representative of the community and special interests, industry, services and commerce, and students and staff.  The CDETB is the statutory agency for vocational and technological education for the City of Dublin. It manages 21 schools and colleges, which cater for 11,000 students.

As of 2021, Ms Cecilia Munro was the principal of the college and the deputy principals were Ms Jacqueline Moloney, Dr Denis Murray and Mr Kenneth Rea.

History 
The college opened in 1979 as the Senior College Ballyfermot Sr. Dr. Margaret Mac Curtain OP was its founding principal. Since then the college has worked with a range of educational and industrial partners to develop and offer a wide range of successful courses in further and higher education. The college caters for students from the age of 17 and upwards. The college offers a choice of 39 courses of Further and Higher Education in 9 departmental.

Senior College Ballyfermot (SCB) 
The Senior College opened in September 1979 to provide the Leaving Certificate to students from Ballyfermot. After consultation with local secondary schools, it was decided that students from three of the local schools, Ballyfermot Vocational School, Caritas and St Dominic's, would complete their Leaving Certificate exams in the Senior College. The new school offered a wide range of subjects to the boys and girls in the area.

The new College also offered secretarial courses to post Leaving and post-Intermediate Certificate students, as well as pre-employment courses for post-Intermediate students.

During the 1980s a range of post-Leaving Cert. courses was introduced into the College, including Preliminary Engineering which had links with Dublin Institute of Technology Bolton Street, Hotel Catering and Tourism courses which had links with CERT, business courses and social care courses. Most of these courses continue today.  In the 1990s the Senior College gave up its Leaving Certificate classes, which returned to the local schools and continued to develop Post-Leaving Certificate courses.

In 2000 the Senior College changed its name to Ballyfermot College of Further Education (BCFE).

Departments 
Within BCFE there are several Departments: Art, Design and Graphics, Moving Images, Business, Engineering, Lifelong Learning, Media, Music, Performance, Management and Sound, Social Care, Television and Film, Travel, Tourism and Reception. The college delivers two degrees, one in Media Production Management (accredited by Dublin City University) and one in Animation (validated by Dundee University), and a number of  BTEC Higher National Diplomas and QQI Level 5 courses.

Buildings 
There are 3 separate buildings within BCFE college. The Main Building and Media Building are side by side, to the left of Ballyfermot Road if coming from the city centre direction. The Arts building is located a short distance away on Kylemore Road.

Alumni

Sara Baume, novelist
Sarah Breen, author
Junior Brother, musician
Daragh O'Connell, co-founder of Brown Bag Films, animation graduate 1992
Eileen Flynn, member of the 26th Seanad
Riyadh Khalaf, Celebrity Masterchef winner 2020, YouTube influencer
Emer McLysaght, journalist and author
Tomm Moore, co-founder of Cartoon Saloon
Aidan Power, television and radio presenter
Mairead Ronan, television and radio presenter
Nora Twomey, co-founder of Cartoon Saloon
Paul Young, co-founder and CEO of Cartoon Saloon

References

External links
 Ballyfermot College of Further Education
 https://www.irishtimes.com/news/education/animators-are-drawing-praise-1.48902
 https://www.awn.com/blog/tonight-reunion-ballyers

Further education colleges in South Dublin (county)